The consensus 1969 College Basketball All-American team, as determined by aggregating the results of four major All-American teams.  To earn "consensus" status, a player must win honors from a majority of the following teams: the Associated Press, the USBWA, The United Press International and the National Association of Basketball Coaches.

1969 Consensus All-America team

Individual All-America teams

AP Honorable Mention:

 Nate Archibald, UTEP
 Bob Arnzen, Notre Dame
 Dennis Awtrey, Santa Clara
 Butch Beard, Louisville
 Bill Bunting, North Carolina
 Larry Cannon, La Salle
 Mike Casey, Kentucky
 Rusty Clark, North Carolina
 Terry Driscoll, Boston College
 Herman Gilliam, Purdue
 Tom Hagan, Vanderbilt
 Simmie Hill, West Texas A&M
 Johnny Jones, Villanova
 Bill Justus, Tennessee
 Sam Lacey, New Mexico State
 Lee Lafayette, Michigan State
 Bob Lienhard, Georgia
 Tommy Little, Seattle
 Willie McCarter, Drake
 Jim McDaniels, Western Kentucky
 Jim McMillian, Columbia
 Cliff Meely, Colorado
 Steve Mix, Toledo
 Rex Morgan, Jacksonville
 Bud Ogden, Santa Clara
 Geoff Petrie, Princeton
 Bob Portman, Creighton
 Marv Roberts, Utah State
 John Roche, South Carolina
 Curtis Rowe, UCLA
 Lynn Shackelford, UCLA
 Ed Siudut, Holy Cross
 Ken Spain, Houston
 Harley Swift, East Tennessee State
 Bob Tallent, George Washington
 George Thompson, Marquette
 Rudy Tomjanovich, Michigan
 Rich Travis, Oklahoma City
 John Warren, St. John's
 Elnardo Webster, Saint Peter's

See also
 1968–69 NCAA University Division men's basketball season

References

NCAA Men's Basketball All-Americans
All-Americans